The National Museum of Indonesia is an archeological, historical, ethnological, and geographical museum located in Jalan Medan Merdeka Barat, Central Jakarta, right on the west side of Merdeka Square. Popularly known as the Elephant Museum after the elephant statue in its forecourt. Its broad collections cover all of Indonesia's territory and almost all of its history. The museum has endeavoured to preserve Indonesia's heritage for two centuries.

The museum is regarded as one of the most complete and the best in Indonesia, as well as one of the finest museum in Southeast Asia. The museum has preserved about 141,000 objects, ranging from prehistoric artifacts to archeology, numismatics, ceramics, ethnography, history and geography collections. It has comprehensive collections of stone statues of the classical Hindu-Buddhist period of ancient Java and Sumatra as well as quite extensive collections of Asian ceramics.

History

Dutch colonial period
On April 24, 1778, a group of Dutch intellectuals established a scientific institution under the name Bataviaasch Genootschap van Kunsten en Wetenschappen, (Royal Batavian Society of Arts and Sciences). This private body had the aim of promoting research in the field of arts and sciences, especially in history, archaeology, ethnography and physics, and publishing various research findings. The main objective of Bataviaasch Genootschap was to analyze the cultural and scientific aspects of the East Indies, including its society and natural environment, through facilitating research conducted by experts.

One of the founders of the institution – JCM Radermacher – donated a building at De Groote Rivier street in the Old Batavia area and a collection of cultural objects and books, which were of great value to start off a museum and library for the society. The other founders of the institution were Jacob de Meijer, Josua van Inperen, Johannes Hooijman, Sirardus Bartlo, Willem van Hogendorp, Hendrik Nicolaas Lacle, Jacobus van der Steeg, Egbert Blomhert, Paulus Gevers and Frederik Baron van Wurmb.

Owing to the institution's growing collections, General Sir Thomas Stamford Raffles built new premises behind the Societeit de Harmonie (today Jalan Majapahit No. 3) at the beginning of the 19th century and named it the Literary Society. In 1862 the Dutch East Indies government decided to build a new museum that would not only serve as an office but also could be used to house, preserve and display the collections.

The museum was officially opened in 1868 and popularly known as Gedung Gajah (Elephant Building) or sometimes called Gedung Arca (The House of Statues). It was called Gedung Gajah on account of the bronze elephant statue in the front yard – a gift to Batavia from King Chulalongkorn of Siam in 1871. It was also called Gedung Arca because a great variety of statues from different periods were on display in the house.

In 1931, the museum's collections were exhibited at the World Colonial Exposition in Paris. Unfortunately, a fire in the exhibition hall demolished the Dutch East Indies' exhibition pavilion and destroyed most of the objects. The museum received some insurance money as compensation and the following year these funds were used to build the old ceramics room, the bronze room and both treasure rooms on the second floor.

Republic of Indonesia period
Following Indonesian independence, in February 1950, the institution was renamed the Lembaga Kebudayaan Indonesia (Indonesian Cultural Institute). On September 17, 1962, it was handed over to the Indonesian government and became known as Museum Pusat (Central Museum). By decree of the Minister of Education and Culture No. 092/0/1979 May 28, 1979, it was renamed the Museum Nasional.

In the last quarter of the 20th century, the museum's manuscripts and literature collections were handed over to the National Library of Indonesia, while its fine arts collection, including paintings, were relocated to the National Gallery.

In 1977, an agreement between Indonesia and the Netherlands acceded to return some cultural treasures back to Indonesia. The prized treasures among others were the treasures of Lombok, the Nagarakretagama lontar manuscript, and an exquisite Prajnaparamita of Java statue. These treasures were sent back from the Netherlands and are now kept in the National Museum of Indonesia.

In the 1980s there was a government policy to establish a museum negeri or state museum in every province of Indonesia. This idea came to reality in 1995 when all provinces of Indonesia had their own state museums. Since then, all archaeological findings discovered in each provinces were not necessarily taken to the National Museum in Jakarta, but are kept and displayed in the province's state museums located in provincial capitals instead. The exceptions however, applied for some highly important archaeological findings, such as the 10th-century Wonoboyo Hoard and bronze Shiva statue.

In 2007, a new building to the north side of the existing building was opened, featuring many artifacts from prehistoric times to modern times. This new building, called Gedung Arca (Statue Building), provides a new exhibition wing. The old building is named Gedung Gajah (Elephant Building).

On September 11, 2013, four precious golden artifacts from the 10th-century Eastern Mataram kingdom period was stolen from the museum. The items were first discovered in the ruins of the Jalatunda ancient royal bathing place and in the temples on the slopes of Mount Penanggungan in Mojokerto Regency, East Java. The four missing artifacts were a dragon-shaped gold plaque, a scripted crescent-shaped gold plaque and one golden-silver Harihara plaque, as well as a small golden box. All the missing items were displayed together in a glass showcase located inside the archaeology gold artifact and treasure room on the second floor of the Gedung Gajah (old wing).

Currently there are two main buildings in the museum, Gedung A (Gedung Gajah or old wing) in the south, and Gedung B (Gedung Arca or the new wing) in the north. The third building, Gedung C, is planned as an extension to house and preserve the museum's extensive collection. By 2017, the old wing or Gedung Gajah was under major renovation, while Gedung C is under construction.

During his state visit to Indonesia in March 2020, King Willem-Alexander of the Netherlands returned the kris of Prince Diponegoro to Indonesia, which was received by President Joko Widodo. Today considered an Indonesian national hero, Prince Diponegoro of Yogyakarta was the charismatic leader of a mass rebellion against Dutch colonial rule in Central Java, who was defeated and taken prisoner after the conclusion of the Java War in 1830. His kris was long considered lost but was located after being identified by the Dutch National Museum of Ethnology in Leiden. The extraordinary gold-inlaid Javanese dagger was previously held as part of the Dutch State Collection and is now part of the collection of the Indonesian National Museum.

Collections

The museum has a collection of 61,600 prehistoric and anthropological artifacts and 5,000 archeological artifacts from all over Indonesia and Asia. The museum collections is among the richest, the most complete, and the best of its kind in Indonesia and one of the finest in Southeast Asia.

The museum acquired its collection through many ways, among others were through scientific expeditions, excavations of archaeological sites, acquisition of private collections, gifts from distinguished patrons, objects donated by religious missions; such as ethnological artifacts acquired by Christian Zending and Catholic missions, and also treasures acquired from a number of Dutch East Indies military campaigns against indigenous kingdoms and polities in the archipelago. Treasures, among others from Java, Aceh, Lombok and Bali acquired through the  Dutch colonial military expeditions, also made to the collection of the Batavian Society and Leiden Museum, and today inherited by the National Museum.

The museum has comprehensive collections of stone statues of classical Hindu-Buddhist period of ancient Java and Sumatra, a kaleidoscope of highly diverse collection of Indonesian ethnography artefacts, as well as quite extensive collections of Asian ceramics. The museum's pottery and ceramics collections in particular is quite remarkable, with a Chinese ceramics collection that dates from the time of the Han (2nd century BC) to the time of the Qing (18th century), complemented with ceramics from neighbouring Southeast Asian countries as well as local Indonesian pottery; it is indeed the largest ceramic collection in Southeast Asia.

Gedung Gajah (Old Wing)

The Gedung Gajah located in the south side, or left from the entrance, is the old wing and the original museum structure which was built during the colonial Dutch East Indies era. The building is popularly named as gedung gajah (Indonesian for elephant building) in reference to the bronze elephant statue in front of the building, which was the gift of Siamese King Chulalongkorn. The museum collections are grouped and arranged by subjects:

Stone Sculpture Collection (Hindu-Buddhist Art of Ancient Indonesia)

The National Museum of Indonesia has the richest and the largest collection of Hindu-Buddhist art of ancient Indonesia. The Hindu-Buddhist sculptures, relics and inscriptions was collected from Java, Bali, Sumatra, and Borneo, all are in display in the lobby, the central hall and the central atrium of the museum. The Buddha statues from Borobudur in various mudras are displayed in the lobby. The centerpiece collection also the largest artifact of the museum is the statue of Adityavarman depicted as Bhairava. This statue is more than 4 meters tall and discovered from Rambahan, Padangroco, West Sumatra.

Notable collections including the well-preserved 9th-century statues of Hindu deities taken from Banon Temple, which consists of Ganesha, Vishnu, Shiva and Agastya. Several statues of Durga Mahisasuramardini discovered in Java, the Tarumanagaran Vishnu statue of Cibuaya, the Srivijayan Avalokiteshvara statue of Bingin Jungut, the Avalokiteshvara head of Aceh, the head statues from Bima temple of Dieng. The statue of Harihara, dated from Majapahit period taken from Simping temple, and the statue of Parvati taken from Rimbi temple are among important Majapahit relics. Numbers of inscriptions are also stored and displayed in this section, including Telaga Batu, Amoghapasa and Anjuk Ladang inscription.

Treasure Rooms (Archaeology and Ethnography Collection)

The second floor of the museum features treasures, gold, and precious artifacts arranged in two rooms: archaeological treasure and ethnology treasure.

The archaeological treasure room features ancient gold and precious relics acquired from archaeological findings, mostly originating from ancient Java. One of the most prized collection of the museum is a statue of Prajnaparamita. Dubbed as the most beautiful sculpture of ancient Java, the goddess of transcendental wisdom is displayed in the entrance of the archaeology treasure room to show how gold jewelries and precious ornaments were worn on the body. Such ancient gold adornments were in display; such as crown, ear adornment, earrings, rings, bracelets, kelat bahu (arm bracelet), leg bracelet, waist band, belt, upawita or tali kasta (golden chain worn across the chest).

One of the most valuable treasure of ancient Java was the famous Wonoboyo hoard. Wonoboyo hoard is the treasures originated from 9th century Hindu Mataram Kingdom discovered in Wonoboyo, Klaten, Central Java, near Prambanan. The treasures are golden bowl with scene of Ramayana, purse, water dipper, umbrella finial, and spoon or ladle, all were made of gold. Also discovered ancient Java gold coins with shape similar to a corn seed.

Golden, silver and bronze Hindu-Buddhist relics were also in display, such as the Hindu gods images made from gold leaf, bronze statue of Shiva Mahadeva with gold applied on his lips and third eye, the bronze statue of Avalokiteshvara and also the silver statue of youthful Manjusri. This 9th-century silver statue of Manjusri was discovered in Ngemplak, Simongan, Semarang, demonstrated Pala art influence in Java as well as a fine example of silver art in ancient Java.

The ethnology treasure room features treasures acquired from royal houses of Indonesia, such as regalias from various istanas, kratons and puri of Indonesian archipelago. Most of these pusaka royal regalias and treasures, were acquired or looted, during Dutch East Indies military campaigns against the archipelago's regional kingdoms, that took place between the 19th to early 20th century; including the royal houses of Banten, Banjarmasin, Bali and Lombok.

The royal regalia and treasures are arranged in several island zones: Sumatra, Java, Bali, Borneo, Sulawesi, and Eastern Indonesia (Nusa Tenggara, Maluku and Papua). The ethnology treasure room display various royal precious objects such as golden jewelries, ceremonial containers and weapons. The jewelries are bracelets and rings embedded with rubies, diamond, precious and semi precious stones. The collections are gilded Balinese kris weapon embedded with precious and semi precious stones and various spear heads. Golden royal crowns, gilded throne, golden royal regalia, golden tobacco container, golden cup, Pekinangan (silver betel-nut set), sword and golden shield is among the collection of the treasure room.

Ceramics collection

The collection of ceramics room is ranged from prehistoric Buni culture, Majapahit terracota, to the ceramics of China, Japan, Vietnam, Thailand, and Myanmar. Majapahit terracota water vessels, statues, roof tiles to piggy bank are on display. The museum houses a large and complete collection of ancient Chinese ceramics. It has one of the best and the most complete collections of Chinese ceramics discovered outside China. The ceramics dated from Han, Tang, Sung, Yuan, Ming, and Qing dynasty spanned for almost two millennia are displayed in the museum.
This particular collection give a good insight into Indonesia's maritime trade over the centuries. Research indicates that the Chinese sailed to India via Indonesia as early as Western Han period (205 BC to 220 AD) as part of maritime silk road and that firm trade relations were subsequently established.

The ceramics collection gathered since 1932 is mainly from the collection of E.W. van Orsoy de Flines, who was also the first curator of this collection until he was repatriated to the Netherlands in 1957. Because he was so fond of this extensive ceramics collection — which reached more than 5 thousands pieces in quantity — he refused to divide them up, so he left all the collection intact in the National Museum's custody. It is important to note that this collection that dated back from Han (2nd century BC) to the time of Qing (18th century) is the largest ceramic collection in Southeast Asia.

After the year 2000, the ceramics collection increased significantly from the addition of ceramics objects retrieved from several sunken ships in Indonesian waters. The latest collection was the ceramics pieces taken from Cirebon shipwreck discovered in 2003.

Ethnography collection

The ethnography collection comprises a wide variety of objects that are part of Indonesian daily life as well as exhibits that are used in ceremonies and rituals. The collections is arranged according to geographic locations of each regions and islands within Indonesian archipelago: from Sumatra, Java, Kalimantan, Bali, Lesser Sunda Islands (Nusa Tenggara), to Sulawesi, Maluku, and Papua.

Examples of ancient cultures include Nias and Batak in Sumatra, the Badui in Java, Balinese, the Dayak of Kalimantan, the Toraja in Sulawesi, and the Asmat and Dani in Papua. The lifestyles of these people remained unchanged for centuries and followed same patterns as that of their ancestors. They still use some traditional laws (adat) to determine their daily activities and ceremonies.

Prehistory collection
The museum stores some Stone Age artifacts such as fossiled skull and skeleton of Homo erectus, Homo floresiensis and Homo sapiens, stone tools, menhir, beads, stone axe, bronze ceremonial axe and Nekara (bronze drum), also ancient weapons from Indonesia.

Historical Relics Collection (Colonial Era Collection)
The front room of the museum features old relics of colonial Indonesia, from the era of Dutch East Indies Company (VOC) to Dutch East Indies. Most of the collections are antique colonial furnitures. However most of the collections has been moved to Jakarta History Museum that mostly features the history of Jakarta especially the colonial history of Batavia (old Jakarta).

Other Collections
Bronze Collection
Textile Collection
Numismatics Collection

Gedung Arca (New Wing)

The new wing called Gedung Arca, located immediately north of the old wing, was inaugurated by President Susilo Bambang Yudhoyono on 20 June 2007. The National Museum expansion and the construction new wing was commenced since 1994, under the initiative of the Minister of Education and Culture Wardiman Djojonegoro. The four-story building is a combination of colonial and modern styles, with the Greek neoclassical facade mirroring the old wing.

Unlike the exhibition layout of the older building, the museum's permanent exhibit in the new building is based on the frameworks of cultural elements, which Prof. Koentjaraningrat classified into seven substances of culture:

 Religious system and religious ceremony
 Societal systems and organization
 Knowledge systems
 Language
 Arts
 Livelihood systems
 Technology and tool systems

Today National Museum has completed the new north wing which consist of a basement and seven levels (floors), four of which host permanent exhibitions, while other levels is functioned as the Museum's office. The layout of the four levels is as follows:

 Level 1: Man and Environment
 Level 2: Knowledge, Technology and Economy
 Level 3: Social Organization and Settlement Patterns
 Level 4: Treasures and Ceramics

These old building and the new wing is connected via the old ethnography room through a glass walled bridge gallery. The bridge gallery is located over the outdoor amphitheatre. The temporary exhibitions with certain themes often took place in this connecting gallery. Cafetaria and souvenir stall is located in the ground floor.
The basement floor host the ASEAN room that feature photos exhibition and modest artifacts from 10 ASEAN countries.

Temporary exhibition

The Gedung Arca also houses two temporary exhibition halls, one in the ground floor and another is in the basement floor. This temporary exhibition usually held for several weeks to a month, with specific focus of interest. For example, the specific exhibitions of 
Indonesian ancient empires; the Majapahit Exhibition in 2007  and the Srivijaya Exhibition in 2017.

The Majapahit Exhibition in 2007 was meant to revisit the archaeological aspect, cultural and historic legacy of Majapahit as the center of a great civilization in the archipelago. The artefacts being displayed in this exhibition among others are the Negarakretagama manuscript, the statue of Raden Wijaya depicted as Harihara from Candi Simping, pieces of pottery, ceramics, temple bas-reliefs and building foundations dated from Majapahit period. The Kedatuan Sriwijaya exhibition held in November 2017 focussed on the Srivijaya maritime empire in its relation to global spice trade.

Indonesian Heritage Society

The Indonesian Heritage Society is a non-profit organization which promotes interest in and knowledge of Indonesia's cultural heritage. Formed by and for members of the multinational community of Jakarta in 1970, it is involved in projects supporting the National Museum. Activities include:
 2 series of six lectures each year
 Study groups
 Library
 Publishing of books, a quarterly newsletter, calendars etc.
 Sales

Activities related to the museum include:

 Museum tours (in English, French, Japanese and Korean)
Volunteer translation of museum documents
School programs – presentations at English and Japanese international schools
Project groups

Similarly, the IHS supports the Jakarta History Museum, Textile Museum and Maritime Museum.

See also
List of museums and cultural institutions in Indonesia
List of national museums
Indonesia Museum
National Museum of Ethnology (Netherlands)
Tropenmuseum
Bangkok National Museum

References

Literature

External links
Museum Nasional Indonesia
Virtual tour of the National Museum of Indonesia provided by Google Arts & Culture

 
1778 establishments in Asia
Museums in Jakarta
Museums established in 1778
Archaeological museums in Indonesia
Ethnographic museums in Indonesia
Cultural Properties of Indonesia in Jakarta